William Cornwallis Cornwallis-West VD JP (20 March 1835 – 4 July 1917), was a British landowner, politician for seven years from 1885 and raised the 6th (Ruthin) Denbighshire Rifle Volunteer Corps followed by further ceremonial duties in the wider territorial army in Wales.

Early life 
He was born William Cornwallis West. He was a son of Frederick Richard West, a Tory MP for Denbigh Boroughs and East Grinstead who was a member of the Canterbury Association and his wife who was born Theresa Whitby.  His father first married Lady Georgiana Stanhope (a daughter of Philip Stanhope, 5th Earl of Chesterfield).

His paternal grandfather was  Frederick West (a son of John West, 2nd Earl De La Warr). His maternal grandparents were both Royal Navy figures: John Whitby and Mary Anne Theresa Symonds (heiress to the fortune of Admiral William Cornwallis). 

He was called to the Bar, Lincoln's Inn, in 1862.

Career 
Cornwallis-West was High Sheriff of Denbighshire in 1872, Lord-Lieutenant of Denbighshire from 1872 to 1917, and a Justice of the Peace for Hampshire and Denbighshire. In 1885 he won a fought election to Parliament for Denbighshire West as a Liberal, a seat he held until 1892 latterly as a Liberal Unionist (which took an anti-Irish Home Rule line). He lost to the Liberal Party's candidate that year as the parties began their clearer left/right split. He raised the 6th (Ruthin) Denbighshire Rifle Volunteer Corps in 1861 and became commanding officer of the 1st Volunteer Battalion, Royal Welch Fusiliers in 1885. In 1890 he became Honorary Colonel of the battalion and later of its successor, the 4th (Denbighshire) Battalion, Royal Welch Fusiliers in the Territorial Force. In 1895 he assumed by deed poll the surname of Cornwallis-West. In his most active years he lived simultaneously in London, at Ruthin Castle, Denbighshire and at Newlands Manor, Milford, Hampshire.

Personal life 
Cornwallis-West married Mary ("Patsy"), daughter of  Frederick Fitzpatrick, in 1872. Born in 1856, "Patsy" was 17 years old. She was known as a great beauty and leading socialite. 

Their children all endured divorce:

 Daisy Cornwallis-West (1873–1943), who married Prince Hans Heinrich XV von Hochberg (going by the name Henry of Pless from 1914).
 George Cornwallis-West (1874–1951), second husband of Lady Randolph Churchill (the American heiress formerly known as Jennie Jerome), mother of Winston Churchill. After their 1914 divorce, he married actress and beauty (including poster and painting subject) Mrs Patrick Campbell known as Mrs Pat – before her earlier marriage known as Beatrice R.S. Tanner.
 Constance (known as Shelagh) Cornwallis-West (1875–1970), who married Hugh Grosvenor, 2nd Duke of Westminster. They divorced and she married her private secretary and agent, Captain John Fitzpatrick Lewis.

Cornwallis-West died in July 1917, aged 82.

Newlands Manor

George, who had already been declared bankrupt, after the sale of certain lots, decided to dispose of the bulk – the rest – of the Hampshire estate so astutely acquired by his great-grandmother.

In 1920 the estate of 2,000 acres was put up for auction in 91 lots. The mansion and its grounds and four lodges were sold in one lot. Other lots included arable, pasture and woodland, building sites in Milford, 30 cottages and farms including Batchley, Kings, Harts, Lea Green and Downton Manor. The house, which had been badly neglected, and 500 acres was bought by Sir John Power, MP for Wimbledon, who made improvements but put it up for sale in 1948. The house and 38 acres were then acquired by a developer who turned it into six flats.

See also
Earl De La Warr

Notes

References

Mary Cornwallis-West at the National Portrait Gallery

External links
 
Article on Mrs Cornwallis-West

1835 births
1917 deaths
Lord-Lieutenants of Denbighshire
People educated at Eton College
Members of Lincoln's Inn
Liberal Party (UK) MPs for Welsh constituencies
UK MPs 1885–1886
UK MPs 1886–1892
Liberal Unionist Party MPs for Welsh constituencies
William Cornwallis-West
High Sheriffs of Denbighshire